Su Hui (born 23 March 1982 in Xi'an, Shaanxi) is a male Chinese rower, who competed for Team China at the 2004 Summer Olympics.

Major performances
2001 National Games – 1st quadruple sculls;
2002/2006 Asian Games – 1st/3rd double sculls;
2003/2004/2006 National Championships – 1st quadruple/single/single sculls;
2005 National Games – 2nd single/quadruple sculls;
2008 World Cup Lucerne – 4th M2X

References

External links
 http://2008teamchina.olympic.cn/index.php/personview/personsen/346

1982 births
Living people
Chinese male rowers
Olympic rowers of China
Sportspeople from Xi'an
Rowers at the 2004 Summer Olympics
Asian Games medalists in rowing
Rowers at the 2002 Asian Games
Rowers at the 2006 Asian Games
Rowers at the 2010 Asian Games
Asian Games gold medalists for China
Asian Games bronze medalists for China
Medalists at the 2002 Asian Games
Medalists at the 2006 Asian Games
Medalists at the 2010 Asian Games
Rowers from Shaanxi
20th-century Chinese people
21st-century Chinese people